Inger Gunhild Maria "Inghilda" Tapio (née Valkeapää, born February 1946 in Gárasavvon, Sweden) is a Saami author, poet, translator, and actress. She writes in both Northern Saami and Swedish.

Biography 
Inghilda Tapio grew up in a Saami reindeer herding family within the Könkämä Sámi reindeer herding village. When she was 7, she was forced to go live in a residential school since the Swedish Government had decided to do away with the mobile versions shortly before she had to go to school. After graduation, she studied Swedish, Northern Saami, English, and pedagogy at Umeå University. Later on, she studied art at Sunderby Folk High School and dramaturgy in Inari, Finland. 

Afterwards, she has worked as an actress with the Sámi theaters Dálvadis and Giron Sámi Teáhter in Kiruna, Sweden and as a teacher. At the same time, she also dedicated herself to writing, drawing, and painting. In 1979, she made her literary debut with the book Mu luondu sámi luondu. In 1995, she won the Saami Council Literature Prize for the Northern Sámi anthology Ii fal dan dihte. 

Tapio lives and works in the border town of Karesuando, where she was born. She and her family share a studio in Čuovžavuohppi where they create literature and artwork together.

In 2016, Australian film director Janet Merewether released a film called Reindeer In My Saami Heart, a portrait of Tapio.

Awards and recognitions 
 1997 – Saami Council Literature Prize
 2013 – Klockrikestipendiet (the Harry Martinson memorial grant) together with her daughter Ulrika Tapio Blind

Bibliography (selected works)

In translation 
Tapio's children's books have been translated into multiple Saami languages and her poetry into English, Spanish, German, and Icelandic.

Literature about Inghilda Tapio

References 

Writers from Lapland (Sweden)
People from Kiruna Municipality
Living people
1946 births
Sámi-language writers
Sámi-language poets